Robert Paul "Bob" Bassen (born May 6, 1965) is a Canadian former professional ice hockey centre. He played in the National Hockey League between 1985 and 2000. Internationally Bassen played for the Canadian national team at the 1985 World Junior Championships, where he won a gold medal, and the 1992 World Championships.

Hockey career

As a youth, Bassen played in the 1977 Quebec International Pee-Wee Hockey Tournament with a minor ice hockey team from Varsity Acres.

Bassen began his career in the National Hockey League in 1984 when he was signed as a free agent by the New York Islanders. After several seasons with the Islanders, Bassen was traded early in the 1988–89 NHL season to the Chicago Blackhawks. He remained in the Blackhawks organization for two seasons before he was claimed by the St. Louis Blues in the waiver draft prior to the start of the 1990–91 NHL season. After spending parts of four seasons with the Blues, he was traded to the Quebec Nordiques. Bassen signed with the Dallas Stars as a free agent in 1995. He played for the Calgary Flames and a second tour with the Blues before ending his NHL career.

After his retirement, Bassen was an assistant coach with the Utah Grizzlies for three years. He currently serves as the director of alumni relations for the Dallas Stars.

Personal life
Bassen resides in the Dallas suburb of Frisco, Texas with his wife Holly and children Brett, Morgan, Riley, and Lane. Bassen is the son of former NHL goaltender Hank Bassen.

Career statistics

Regular season and playoffs

International

Awards
 WHL East First All-Star Team – 1985

References

External links
 

1965 births
Living people
Calgary Flames players
Canadian expatriate ice hockey players in Germany
Canadian ice hockey centres
Chicago Blackhawks players
Dallas Stars players
Frankfurt Lions players
Indianapolis Ice players
Kalamazoo Wings (1974–2000) players
Medicine Hat Tigers players
New York Islanders players
Quebec Nordiques players
St. Louis Blues players
Ice hockey people from Calgary
Springfield Indians players
Undrafted National Hockey League players